Niccolò da Uzzano (1359 - 1431 in Florence) was an Italian politician, the Gonfaloniere of Justice in the government of Florence.

Florence's Palazzo Capponi alle Rovinate was built on his behalf in the first half of the fifteenth century (completed in 1426) by Lorenzo di Bicci, who always carried out Niccolò's wishes, including those for  frescoes and a painting for the Church of Saint Lucia dei Magnoli, which though documented are now lost.

Rinaldo degli Albizzi, a Florentine politician who was openly against the political rise of Cosimo de' Medici the Elder was held in check by Niccolò da Uzzano as long as he lived.

Niccolò's family took its name from the Castle of Uzzano in Greve in Chianti.

In the Bargello Museum in Florence, there is a polychrome terracotta bust of Niccolò, attributed to Donatello, dated to around 1432.

References

15th-century people of the Republic of Florence
14th-century people of the Republic of Florence
1359 births
1431 deaths
Politicians from Florence
Busts in Italy